Albsfelde is a municipality in the district of Lauenburg, in Schleswig-Holstein, Germany.

History
During the ages of the Vikings, trade with the village of Niendorf bei Berkenthin flourished. The reason behind is, is the Stecknitz river also known as the "Boassee". Between 1939 and 1945 there was a short break, due to unknown reason 
trade was not allowed in this time of existence.

References

Herzogtum Lauenburg